Norashen (Armenian: Նորաշեն 'new village') may refer to:

Armenia
Norashen, Ararat
Norashen, Aragatsotn
Norashen, Gegharkunik
Norashen, Lori
Norashen, Tavush
Norabats, Ararat, formerly Norashen
Shoghakn, Aparan, formerly Norashen

Azerbaijan
Norashen, Nakhchivan
Günəşli, Khojavend, or Norashen
Sharur, formerly Norashen

See also
Norashen Church, Tbilisi, Georgia